In dermatopathology, the Tzanck test, also Tzanck smear, is scraping of an ulcer base to look for Tzanck cells.  It is sometimes also called the chickenpox skin test and the herpes skin test. It is a simple, low-cost, and rapid office based test.

Tzanck cells (acantholytic cells) are found in:
Herpes simplex
Varicella and herpes zoster
Pemphigus vulgaris
Cytomegalovirus

Arnault Tzanck did the first cytological examinations in order to diagnose skin diseases. To diagnose pemphigus, he identified acantholytic cells, and to diagnose of herpetic infections he identified multinucleated giant cells and acantholytic cells. He extended his cytologic findings to certain skin tumors as well.

Even though cytological examination can provide rapid and reliable diagnosis for many skin diseases, its use is limited to a few diseases. In endemic regions, Tzanck test is used to diagnose leishmaniasis and leprosy. For other regions, Tzanck test is mainly used to diagnose pemphigus and herpetic infections. Some clinics use biopsies even for herpetic infections. This is because the advantages of this test are not well known, and the main textbooks of dermatopathology do not include dedicated sections for cytology or Tzanck smear. A deep learning model called TzanckNet has been developed to lower the experience barrier needed to use this test.

Procedure

 Unroof vesicle and scrape base w/ sterile №15 scalpel blade
 Smear onto a clean glass slide
 Fix w/ gentle heat or air dry
 Fix w/ MeOH (Methanol)
 Stain w/ Giemsa, methylene blue or Wright’s stain.
 Microscopic examination using an oil immersion lens. (Look for multinucleated giant cells)

A modified test can be performed using proprietary agents which requires fewer steps and allows the sample to be fixed quicker.

Cytologic findings 
For microscopic evaluation, samples are first scanned with low magnification objectives (X4 and X10) and then examined in detail with the high magnification objective (X100). The X4 objectives are used to select the areas to investigate in detail and to detect some ectoparasites, but the basis of the cytological diagnostic process is the X10 objective. With X10 magnification, the individual characteristics of the cells, the relationship of the cells to each other and the presence of some infection and infestation agents are evaluated. For this reason, most of the cytological examination is spent at this magnification, and most samples are diagnosed at this magnification. The key cytological findings that are observed at low magnification or, in other words, should be investigated according to the clinical characteristics of the patient are as follows: acantholytic cells, tadpole cells, granulomatous inflammation, infectious agents and increases in specific cells.

Major indications, cytologic findings and diagnostic value of Tzanck smear test

Tzanck smear examples

References

External links
Tzanck test - medlineplus.org.
Definition of Tzanck test - medterms.com.

Medical tests
Pathology
Chickenpox